Marie Magdelaine Mouron, also known as Picard and La Garonne (floruit 1696), was a French soldier. She served in the French army from 1690 until 1696. She served under the Duke of Noailles in Catalonia and participated in the Siege of Rosas in 1693. Her biological gender was exposed after she was forced to seek medical attention after winning a duel with a male comrade. In March 1696, she was arrested accused of desertion, during which her story was documented. 

The documentation of her case is considered to have great historic value for several reasons: it documents a case of a female early modern age soldier without the sensationalism usually surrounding narratives of such occurrences; it also documents the life of a common foot soldier of the French army regardless of gender, as narratives of French foot soldiers of this epoch are quite rare.

References 
 John A. Lynn: The French Wars 1667-1714: The Sun King at War (2002)

Women in 17th-century warfare
French military personnel of the Nine Years' War
Women in European warfare
Female duellists
French duellists